Idaho Legislative District 3 is one of 35 districts of the Idaho Legislature. It is currently represented by Bob Nonini, Republican  of Coeur d'Alene, Ron Mendive, Republican of  Coeur d'Alene, and Don Cheatham, Republican of Post Falls.

District profile (1992–2002) 
From 1992 to 2002, District 3 consisted of a portion of Kootenai County.

District profile (2002–2012) 
From 2002 to 2012, District 3 consisted of a portion of Kootenai County.

District profile (2012–2022) 
District 3 currently consists of a portion of Kootenai County.

District profile (2022–) 
In December 2022, District 3 will consist of a portion of Kootenai County.

See also

 List of Idaho Senators
 List of Idaho State Representatives

References

External links
Idaho Legislative District Map (with members)

03
Kootenai County, Idaho